Nazem Akkari (1902 in Tripoli, Ottoman Empire – 11 March 1985) was a Lebanese politician who became the 19th Prime Minister of Lebanon for a short period 9 to 14 September 1952 and then temporary Deputy Prime Minister of Lebanon until 30 September 1952 in the most turbulent time of transfer of power from President Bechara El Khoury to President Camille Chamoun in September 1952.

Prime Minister
During the last month of the rule of incumbent President Bechara El Khoury, the Lebanese president of the Republic was faced with fierce opposition that objected to his plans for renewal for a second term. The opposition was led by a big coalition of Christian and Muslim forces under the banner of the "National Socialist Front".

El Khoury assigned Nazem Akkari to form an emergency caretaker government until the Presidential elections. The result was a three-member cabinet that included:
Nazem Akkari - Prime Minister—also carrying the portfolios of Foreign Affairs, Internal Affairs, Defense, Agriculture and Information
Bassil Trad - Deputy Prime Minister—also carrying portfolios of Economy, Public Works, Education, Health
Moussa Moubarak - portfolios for Justice, Finance, Social Affairs, Post Telephone and Telegraph (PTT)

The Akkari government was declared on 9 September 1952.

Deputy Prime Minister
Akkari's four-day premiership led way to a new military-led government under the supervision of the temporary holding of power by General Chehab. In this new takeover government, Nazem Akkari was assigned as Deputy Prime Minister of Lebanon and given the portfolios of Foreign Affairs, Interior Affair, Public Works, Information, Education, Post Telephone and Telegraph (PTT) and Agriculture in the interim period 18–30 September until installation of the new President Camille Chamoun.

Things only settled with the assignment of Khaled Chehab as Prime Minister on 1 October 1952. This government survived for seven months during the reign of President Camille Chamoun and lasted until 1 May 1953.

References

External links

1902 births
1985 deaths
Lebanese Sunni Muslims
Prime Ministers of Lebanon
Deputy prime ministers of Lebanon
Defense ministers of Lebanon
Interior ministers of Lebanon
Grand Crosses with Star and Sash of the Order of Merit of the Federal Republic of Germany